Prionorhynchiidae is an extinct family of brachiopods belonging to the order Rhynchonellida.

These brachiopods are stationary epifaunal suspension feeders. They lived in the Triassic and in the Jurassic periods, from 235.0 to 164.7 Ma.

Genera
Amoenirhynchia
Lokutella
Prionorhynchia
Sphenorhynchia

References

Rhynchonellida
Jurassic brachiopods
Triassic brachiopods
Prehistoric protostome families
Triassic first appearances
Jurassic extinctions